Knowledge-based processors (KBPs) are used for processing packets in computer networks.  Knowledge-based processors are designed with the goal of increased performance of the IPv6 network.  By contributing to the buildout of the IPv6 network, KBPs provide the means to an improved and secure networking system.

Standards 
All networks are required to perform the following functions:
 IPv4/IPv6 multilayer packet/flow classification
 Policy-based routing and Policy enforcement (QoS)
 Longest Prefix Match (CIDR)
 Differentiated Services (DiffServ)
 IP Security (IPSec)
 Server Load Balancing
 Transaction verification

All of the above functions must occur at high speeds in advanced networks.  Knowledge-based processors contain embedded databases that store information required to process packets that travel through a network at wireline speeds.  Knowledge based processors are a new addition to intelligent networking that allow these functions to occur at high speeds and at the same time provide for lower power consumption.

Knowledge-based processors currently target the 3rd layer of the 7 layer OSI model which is devoted to packet processing.

Advantages 
The advantages that knowledge based processors offer are the ability to execute multiple simultaneous decision making processes for a range of network-aware processing functions. These include routing, Quality of service (QOS), access control for both security and billing, as well as the forwarding of voice/video packets. These functions improve the performance of advanced Internet applications in IPv6 networks such as VOD (Video on demand), VoIP (voice over Internet protocol), and streaming of video and audio.

Knowledge-based processors use a variety of techniques to improve network functioning such as parallel processing, deep pipelining and advanced power management techniques. Improvements in each of these areas allows for existing components to carry on their functions at wireline speeds more efficiently thus improving the performance of the overall network.

The databases in a knowledge-based processor include classification tables, forwarding tables, and exact match tables- all of which are utilized by the CPU and network processors. 

Knowledge based processors mainly process packet headers (20% of the packet approximately) which enables network awareness.  Content processors, by contrast, allow for packet payload inspection (80% of the packet is data) and therefore must search "deeper" into the packet.

See also
 Network processor
 Multi core processor
 Content processor

References 

Computer networks